Capital Ward or Ward 17 (French: Quartier Capitale) is a city ward located in the centre of Ottawa, Ontario. Situated just south of downtown Ottawa, the ward includes the communities of Old Ottawa East, Old Ottawa South, the Glebe, Heron Park, Carleton University, and Riverside

Out of all the wards currently in existence, Capital ward has existed the longest. It was originally created in 1909 from parts of Wellington Ward and Central Ward when the Glebe was settled. The original capital ward consisted solely of the Glebe. It eventually annexed Old Ottawa South before assuming its current borders.

Its first aldermen were John Carnochan and J. W. Nelson.

Councillors

Election results

1974 Ottawa municipal election

1976 Ottawa municipal election

1978 Ottawa municipal election

1980 Ottawa municipal election

1982 Ottawa municipal election

1985 Ottawa municipal election

1988 Ottawa municipal election

1991 Ottawa municipal election

1994

1994 Ottawa-Carleton Regional Municipality elections

1994 Ottawa municipal election

1997

1997 Ottawa-Carleton Regional Municipality elections

1997 Ottawa municipal election

2000 Ottawa municipal election

2003 Ottawa municipal election

2006 Ottawa municipal election

2010 Ottawa municipal election
Former Green Party deputy leader defeated Liberal Party staffer Isabel Metcalfe and activist Bob Brocklebank. Chernushenko won in the Glebe, Old Ottawa South and Old Ottawa East, Metcalfe won the Riverside apartments and Heron Park while Brocklebank won Carleton University.

2014 Ottawa municipal election

2018 Ottawa municipal election

2022 Ottawa municipal election

References

External links
 Map of Capital Ward

Ottawa wards